Henri Ribul (born 1 March 1941) is a French footballer. He competed in the men's tournament at the 1968 Summer Olympics.

References

External links
 

1941 births
Living people
French footballers
Olympic footballers of France
Footballers at the 1968 Summer Olympics
Footballers from Toulouse
Association football goalkeepers
Mediterranean Games gold medalists for France
Mediterranean Games medalists in football
Competitors at the 1967 Mediterranean Games